2-Phenyl-3-aminobutane (also known as β-methylamphetamine) is a stimulant of the phenethylamine class that is closely related to its α-methyl analog Pentorex. It was first synthesized by the German scientists Felix Haffner and Fritz Sommer in 1939 as a stimulant with milder effects, shorter duration, lower toxicity and fewer side effects compared to previously known drugs such as amphetamine.

2-Phenyl-3-aminobutane is banned in some countries as a structural isomer of methamphetamine.

See also
 β-Methylphenethylamine
 β-Phenylmethamphetamine
 Phentermine

References 

Anorectics
Norepinephrine-dopamine releasing agents
Phenethylamines
Substituted amphetamines